Cispia punctifascia is a moth of the family Erebidae first described by Francis Walker in 1855. It is found in India, Sri Lanka, Sumatra, Borneo and originated in Malaysia.

The moth is dull pale orange. The male sex has a strongly bipectinate (comb-like on both sides) antennae.

References

Lymantriini
Moths of Asia
Moths described in 1855